Lars Hermel (born 28 September 1970) is a German former professional football defender who played for 1. FC Karl-Marx-Stadt, FSV Zwickau, SC Freiburg and Bahlinger SC. He works as youth coach for SC Freiburg.

He was a part of the East German squad at the 1989 FIFA World Youth Championship, playing all three matches.

References

External links
 
 

Living people
1970 births
Association football defenders
German footballers
East German footballers
Chemnitzer FC players
FSV Zwickau players
SC Freiburg players
German football managers
Sportspeople from Chemnitz
Bundesliga players
2. Bundesliga players
Footballers from Saxony
Bahlinger SC players